Compass One (formerly known as Compass Point) is a suburban shopping mall located in the town centre of Sengkang, Singapore. The mall was built as an integrated development together with a condominium, Compass Heights which is located adjacent to the mall. Originally opened on 1 August 2002, the mall closed for extensive renovation works on 26 October 2015 and re-opened on 1 September 2016.

History
Compass Point was built as an integrated development together with the adjacent Sengkang MRT/LRT station and Compass Heights condominium. Constructed at a cost of S$230 million, the shopping mall started operations on 1 August 2002. The shopping centre was the first major mall to open on the North East line.

Before the renovation works, the mall was Singapore's first thematic suburban shopping mall based on the theme of learning. Educational panels and informative posters are mounted on railings and walls, which feature interesting trivia based on particular themes updated periodically. After getting feedback from the public and commissioning a survey of residents in the area, conducted by international property adviser DTZ Debenham Tie Leung Limited, the mall's developer, Centrepoint Properties, proposed the learning theme for the shopping mall to cater to the predominantly young families of Sengkang New Town. Retail space was spread out over four storeys and a basement. Each storey of the shopping centre was named after the five major continents, with motifs showing different aspects of that continent, such as flora and sea transport vessels: Oceania (basement storey); Asia (ground floor); Europe (2nd storey); The Americas (3rd); and Africa (4th).

Change of ownership and renovation works
In December 2015, it was announced that real estate fund manager M&G Real Estate will become the sole owner of Compass Point mall in Sengkang, after entering into a deed to acquire the remaining 18.99 percent of shares owned by Frasers Centrepoint. The buyout was finalised in February 2016 and M&G Real Estate announced that the mall will reopen on 1 September 2016 after upon completion of the upgrading works under a new name and new management. The mall was called 1 Sengkang Mall after a competition on Facebook with the winner getting $1000 in cash with the most 'likes', but was officially renamed Compass One by the management after the public wanted to stick to the original name.

Compass One reopened on 1 September 2016 with a new interior design, 180 specialty tenants and a redesigned interior layout. The Sengkang Public Library, which opened on 18 March 2017, occupies a portion of Levels 3 and 4. There is a play deck that consists of a wet and dry playground at Level 4. The returning tenants are Cold Storage, Kopitiam and Japan Home. In addition, Rubi Shoes opened one store in Compass One at the same opening, together with Cotton On Body and Cotton On. In 2022, Cold Storage at Compass One was refurbished with a new look and a new logo.

Accessibility
Compass One Shopping Mall is located next to the Sengkang MRT/LRT station, Sengkang Bus Interchange and Compassvale Bus Interchange.

Gallery (as Compass Point)

See also
 Sengkang Community Hub
 Sengkang Bus Interchange
 Compassvale Bus Interchange

References

External links
Compass One website

Buildings and structures in Sengkang
Sengkang
Sengkang Town Centre
Shopping malls in Singapore
Buildings and structures completed in 2002
2002 establishments in Singapore
Tourist attractions in North-East Region, Singapore